Johannes Wohnseifer (born 1967) is a German artist based in Cologne.

Early life and education 
Wohnseifer was born in Cologne, Germany.

Work 
Wohnseifer often draws reference to the German history of his youth, such as the 1972 Summer Olympics and the Red Army Faction. He creates smooth, glossy, billboard-like paintings.

Exhibitions 
Wohnseifer has exhibited in shows including Irresistible Impulse at Galerie Gisela Capitain in Cologne, Intervention at Sprengel Museum in Hanover, Hein, Schellberg, Wohnseifer at Schnittraum  in Cologne.  He has shown at the Hara Museum of Contemporary Art in Tokyo, Union Gallery in London and Galerie Yvon Lambert in Paris.

Art market 
Wohnseifer is represented by Casey Kaplan in New York, Johann König in Berlin, Praz-Delavallade in Paris/Los Angeles and Nicolas Krupp in Basel.

References

External links

Johannes Wohnseifer at Johann König
Johannes Wohnseifer at Saatchi Gallery

1967 births
Living people
German painters
German male painters